Campa Cola is a soft drink brand in India. It was a market leader in the Indian soft drink market in the 1970s and 1980s in most regions of India until the advent of the foreign players Pepsi and Coca-Cola after the liberalisation policy of the P. V. Narasimha Rao government in 1991.

History

Campa Cola was a drink created by the Pure Drinks Group in the 1970s.

Pure Drinks Group were pioneers in the Indian soft drink industry when they introduced Coca-Cola into India in 1949, and were the sole manufacturers and distributors of Coca-Cola till the 1970s when Coke was asked to leave. The Pure Drinks Group and Campa Beverages Pvt. Ltd. virtually dominated the entire Indian soft drink industry for about 15 years, and then started Campa Cola during the absence of foreign competition.  The brand's slogan was "The Great Indian Taste", an appeal to nationalism. It subsequently marketed an orange flavoured drink called 'Campa Orange', with the logo "Campa" on its bottles.

During the 1980s, Campa Orange and Rush were the two main orange soft drinks in India, with large bottling plants in Mumbai (Worli) and Delhi. Following the return of foreign corporations to the soft drink market in the 1990s, the popularity of Campa Cola declined. In 2000–2001, its bottling plant and offices in Delhi were closed. In 2009 a small amount of product was still being bottled in the state of Haryana but the drink was hard to find. 

In 2022, Campa Cola was acquired by Reliance Industries for  crores. Reliance Retail Ventures, the retail arm of the Reliance group launched three variants of the drinks (cola, orange and lemon) at some select stores.

Current operations
Reliance Consumer Products (RCPL), the fast-moving consumer goods arm and subsidiary of Reliance Retail Ventures (RRVL), on 9th March 2023 announced the relaunch of the iconic brand, Campa.

The Campa portfolio will initially include Campa Cola, Campa Lemon and Campa Orange in the sparkling beverage category.

See also
 List of soft drinks by country

References

External links
 Making a comeback through online sales portal: Tezcart.

Products introduced in 1977
Indian drink brands
Defunct brands